Dmitriy Menshikov (born December 1, 1997) is a Russian kickboxer who competed in the Glory Welterweight division. He is ranked as the second best welterweight in the world by Combat Press as of September 2022, and the third best by Beyond Kick as of October 2022.

Kickboxing career

Early years
Menshikov participated in the 2017 Tatneft Cup 80 kg tournament. In the first, quarterfinal, bout of the tournament, Menshikov was scheduled to fight Constantin Rusu. Dmitry won the fight by a second-round TKO. In the semifinals he fought Surik Magakyan, and won by a first-round TKO. In the tournament final, Menshikov fought Sher Mamazulunov. The fight went into an extra fourth round, after which Mamazulunov won a decision.

In his next fight, Menshikov won an extra round decision against Ljubo Jalovi. He won his next two fights against Vasiliy Semenov and Аli Al Ameri by KO.

Glory
He made his Glory debut at Glory 60: Lyon on October 20, 2018, when he was scheduled to fight Samuel Dbili. Menshikov won the fight by a first-round technical knockout. He next appeared during Glory 62, on December 8, 2018, to fight Robbie Hageman. Menshikov once again won by a first-round technical knockout.

Menshikov's next fight was outside of Glory, as he was booked to face Carlos Prates at Muay Thai Factory 1 on December 22, 2018. He won the fight by decision.

Menshikov's next fight came ten months after his win over Prates. He was scheduled to fight Yoann Kongolo during Glory 69. Dmitry won the fight by TKO, after the ringside doctor stopped the fight, due to a cut Kongolo suffered during the second round.

Menshikov was scheduled to fight Mohamed Mezouari at Glory 78: Arnhem. Menshikov later withdrew from the bout and was replaced by Vedat Hoduk.

RCC Fair Fight
Menskikov faced Maxim Sulgin at RCC 8 on December 19, 2020. He won the fight by unanimous decision. Menshikov next faced Ismail Uzuner at the February 5, 2022 event, following a fourteen-month absence from the sport. He won the fight by unanimous decision.

As a protest against the ongoing 2022 Russian invasion of Ukraine, Glory terminated all their Russian athletes contracts, including Menshikov's, on June 20, 2022.

Menshikov faced Maxim Sulgin in the main event of RCC Fair Fight 18 on July 15, 2022. The bout was fought in MMA gloves. He won the fight by unanimous decision. Three judges scored the fight 29–28 for Menshikov, while the remaining two judges scored the fight 30–27 and 30–29 in his favor.

Menshikov faced Mehran Mohammadnia at Muaythai Factory on February 2, 2023. He won the fight by a second-round technical knockout.

Achievements
Tafnet Cup
2017 Tatneft Arena Cup -80 kg Tournament Runner-up

Kickboxing record 

|-  style="background:#cfc"
| 2023-02-02||Win ||align=left| Mehran Mohammadnia || Muaythai Factory || Kemerovo, Russia || TKO (3 Knockdowns)|| 2 ||  

|-  bgcolor="#cfc"
| 2022-07-15 || Win ||align=left| Maxim Sulgin || RCC Fair Fight 18 || Yekaterinburg, Russia || Decision (Unanimous) || 3 || 3:00 

|-  bgcolor="#cfc"
| 2022-02-05 || Win ||align=left| Ismail Uzuner || Muay Thai Factory 4 || Kemerovo, Russia || Decision (unanimous)  || 3 || 3:00 
|-  bgcolor="#CCFFCC"
| 2020-12-19 || Win||align=left| Maxim Sulgin || RCC 8 || Yekaterinburg, Russia || Decision (Unanimous) || 3 || 3:00

|-  bgcolor="#CCFFCC"
| 2019-10-12 || Win||align=left| Yoann Kongolo || Glory 69: Düsseldorf || Germany || TKO (Doctor Stoppage) || 2 || 2:59
|-  bgcolor="#CCFFCC"
| 2018-12-22 || Win ||align=left| Carlos Prates  || Muay Thai Factory 1|| Russia || Decision || 3 || 3:00
|-  bgcolor="#CCFFCC"
| 2018-12-08 || Win ||align=left| Robbie Hageman  || Glory 62: Rotterdam || Rotterdam, Netherlands || TKO (Punches) || 1 || 1:53
|-  bgcolor="#CCFFCC"
| 2018-10-20|| Win ||align=left| Samuel Dbili || Glory 60: Lyon || Lyon, France || TKO (3 Knockdowns rule)|| 1 || 2:59
|-  bgcolor="#CCFFCC"
| 2018-09-06|| Win ||align=left| Аli Al Ameri || TATNEFT CUP || Russia || KO (Knee to the body)|| 4 ||
|-  bgcolor="#CCFFCC"
| 2018-07-08|| Win ||align=left| Vasiliy Semenov || Fair Fight V || Yekaterinburg, Russia || KO (Knees and Punches)|| 3 || 1:40
|-  bgcolor="#CCFFCC"
| 2018-06-27|| Win ||align=left| Ljubo Jalovi || TATNEFT CUP || Russia || Ext.R Decision|| 4 ||
|-  bgcolor="#FFBBBB"
| 2017-12-14|| Loss ||align=left| Sher Mamazulunov || TATNEFT CUP, -80 kg Tournament Final || Russia || Ext.R Decision|| 4 || 
|- 
! style=background:white colspan=9 |
|-  bgcolor="#CCFFCC"
| 2017-10-27|| Win ||align=left| Surik Magakyan || TATNEFT CUP, -80 kg Tournament Semi Final || Russia || TKO (Left Hook) || 1 ||
|-  bgcolor="#CCFFCC"
| 2017-09-06|| Win ||align=left| Constantin Rusu || TATNEFT CUP, -80 kg Tournament Quarter Final || Russia || TKO (Straight Right) || 2 || 2:25
|-  bgcolor="#CCFFCC"
| 2017-06-27|| Win ||align=left| Janilson da Cruz || TATNEFT CUP || Russia || KO (Overhand Right) || 1 || 0:15
|-
| colspan=9 | Legend:    

|-
|-  style="background:#fbb;"
| 2022-03-23|| Loss ||align=left| Salimsultan Aminov || 2022 Russian Muaythai Championship, Tournament Quarterfinal || Ulan-Ude, Russia || Decision (Unanimous) || 3 ||3:00
|-
|-  style="background:#cfc;"
| 2015-11-05 || Win ||align=left| Alexander Petrunin  || 2015 Russian Muaythai Championship, Tournament Semifinal || Ulan-Ude, Russia || Decision (Unanimous) || 3 ||3:00
|-
|-  style="background:#cfc;"
| 2015-11-04 || Win ||align=left| Mairbek Midiev || 2015 Russian Muaythai Championship, Tournament Quarterfinal || Ulan-Ude, Russia || Decision (Unanimous) || 3 ||3:00
|-
|-  style="background:#fbb;"
| 2014-03-16 || Loss ||align=left| Vladimir Kuzmin || 2014 Russian Cup || Russia || Decision  || 3 ||3:00
|-
| colspan=9 | Legend:

See also 
List of male kickboxers

References

External links
 Glory Kickboxing Profile

Russian male kickboxers
Living people
1993 births
Welterweight kickboxers
Sportspeople from Kemerovo Oblast
People from Prokopyevsk